CLEVNET is a library consortium headquartered at Cleveland Public Library. It was founded in 1982 and includes over 40 public library systems in northeast Ohio. CLEVNET provides access to more than 12 million titles of books, movies, music and e-books.
CLEVNET was also the headquarters for Ohio's virtual reference service, KnowItNow24x7, from 2001 to its closing in 2015.

History
The origins of CLEVNET date to the automation of Cleveland Public Library's card catalog in the late 1970s and early 1980s under Director Ervin Gaines in partnership with Data Research Associates (DRA). In an effort to share the capabilities of the online catalog with other libraries, Director Gaines invited other area libraries to connect to the new technology. Cleveland Heights-University Heights Public Library was the first library to express interest. In December 1981, an agreement between the two libraries was approved, and the Cleveland Heights–University Heights Public Library came online on December 1, 1982, officially launching the CLEVNET consortium.

The original online catalog system ran from its inception in 1979 until a brief "shutdown" in 1990 for upgrades. The scope of the upgrade was outlined with additional details by a Letter To The Editor from Robert T. Carterette: "Clevnet is one of the largest library resource-sharing networks in the United States today, making 1.6 million titles available to public libraries throughout Northern Ohio... in addition to 4.2 million items owned by the Clevnet libraries, 1.6 million title records, 106,000 book order records, and 32,500 Union List of Periodical records must be processed, a total of 5.9 million. The system processes the 3.6 gigabytes of data."

In 2003, Cleveland Public Library, which administered CLEVNET, chose Sirsi as its new source for public library technology products and services.

In 2009, CLEVNET member libraries, including Cleveland Public Library, were the first public libraries to offer e-books to download in the EPUB format.

In 2016, CLEVNET made the decision to move its servers from Cleveland Public Library to the State of Ohio Computer Center (SOCC) in Columbus, Ohio.

In May 2017, Rocky River Public Library joined CLEVNET. In September 2018, Morley Library joined the consortium.

CLEVNET is mentioned on page 105 in the 2017 fiction work The Unclaimed Victim by D. M. Pulley, a Cleveland author.

Participating libraries
The following are the current members of the CLEVNET consortium and their date of entry into the network.
 Cleveland Public Library 1982
 Cleveland Heights-University Heights Public Library 1982
 Shaker Heights Public Library 1983
 Willoughby-Eastlake Public Library 1983
 Elyria Public Library 1984
 Euclid Public Library 1984
 Ritter Public Library 1984
 Sandusky Public Library 1984
 East Cleveland Public Library 1985
 Hudson Library & Historical Society 1985
 Medina County District Library 1985
 Cleveland Law Library (not a public library) 1985
 Orrville Public Library 1985
 Twinsburg Public Library 1985
 Wayne County Public Library 1985
 Lorain Public Library System 1990
 Perry Public Library 1992
 Madison (Ohio) Public Library 1993
 Wickliffe Public Library 1995
 Bellevue Public Library 1996
 Clyde Public Library 1997
 Fairport Harbor Public Library 1997
 Kirtland Public Library 1997
 Birchard Public Library 1999
 Milan-Berlin Public Library 2000
 Huron Public Library 2001
 Kingsville Public Library 2001
 Peninsula Public Library 2002
 Burton Public Library 2005
 Barberton Public Library 2009
 Bristol Public Library 2011
 Hubbard Public Library 2011
 Girard Free Library 2011
 Kinsman Public Library 2011
 McKinley Memorial Library 2011
 Newton Falls Public Library 2011
 Norwalk Public Library 2012
 Andover Public Library 2013
 Conneaut Public Library 2013
 Harbor-Topky Public Library 2013
 Henderson Memorial Public Library 2013
 Rock Creek Public Library 2013
 Geauga County Public Library 2017
 Rocky River Public Library 2017
 Morley Library 2018
 Mentor Public Library 2019
 Stow-Munroe Falls Public Library 2021

References

Public libraries in Ohio
Government of Ohio
Library consortia in Ohio